The Hawk Returns is an album by Coleman Hawkins, released in 1954 on Savoy Records.

Other musicians on the album were uncredited; however, the 1953-1954 entry in the Chronological Classics series (which includes these recordings) lists organist Les Strand and guitarist Leo Blevins on the first six tracks, and Sun Ra as the pianist on tracks 7-12.

Track listing
"Goin' Down Home" Ozzie Cadena
"I'll Follow My Secret Heart" Noël Coward
"On My Way" Ozzie Cadena
"I'll Tell You Later" Adam Brenner
"What a Diff'rence a Day Made" Stanley Adams (singer) María Grever
"Last Stop" Ozzie Cadena
"Should I?" Nacio Herb Brown Arthur Freed
"Flight Eleven"  Coleman Hawkins
"Modern Fantasy" Coleman Hawkins
"Confessin'" Doc Daugherty Al J. Neiburg Ellis Reynolds
"September Song" Maxwell Anderson Kurt Weill
"They Can't Take That Away from Me" George Gershwin Ira Gershwin

References

1954 albums
Coleman Hawkins albums